Gangwei is a town in Longhai City, in Zhangzhou, Fujian, China (PRC).

History

In the Second Taiwan Strait Crisis in 1958, Daomei in Gangwei was one of the areas from which PLA forces shelled Kinmen County (Quemoy), Republic of China (Taiwan). The Daomei milita dug eleven trenches and built 136 air raid shelters. On September 8, Chinese Nationalist forces fired 1,285 shells at Wu Yu, destroying 151 homes and a granary. 37 members of the Daomei militia took eight boats to Wu Yu bringing 130,000 jin of food for the islanders. No one died or was injured.

In February–March 1959, Huojian Commune ('rocket commune') and Hongqi Commune ('red flag commune') were combined to create Gangwei Commune.

In late 1984, Gangwei Commune became Gangwei Township.

On January 1, 1988, ten villages of Gangwei Township were transferred to Longjiao She Ethnic Township.

On December 29, 1988, Gangwei Township became Gangwei Town.

Railway development plans include the construction of a 45-km-long branch line from Zhangzhou railway station eastward, across most of Longhai City, to terminate at the China Merchants Group industrial area on the southwestern shore of Xiamen Harbor, opposite Xiamen Island. The branch will be known as the Gangwei Railway, and will support trains running at speeds up to 120 km/h. Its opening is planned for 2013.

Geography
Islands in Gangwei include:
 Bai Yu
 Shuangyu Dao, man-made island 
 Pozao Yu
 Qing Yu (Ch'ing Hsü, Chingyu;  / , also )  (southwest of Dadan Island and Erdan Island in Lieyu Township, Kinmen County, Taiwan (ROC))
 Wu'an Yu
 Wu Yu (Wu Hsu; /)  (south of Dadan Island and Erdan Island in Lieyu Township, Kinmen County, Taiwan (ROC))
 Xiaopozao Yu

Administrative divisions

The town administers 1 residential community and 15 villages:
 Meishi
 Tangtou
 Dongkeng
 Gucheng
 Shengshan
 Shibu
 Shangwu
 Meishi 
 Chengwai
 Gelin
 Shatan/Shayun (/)
 Kaohou
 Zhuoqi
 Doumei
 Shenwo/Shen'ao (/)
 Wuyu, centered on the island Wu Yu

Demographics

References

Zhangzhou
Township-level divisions of Fujian